The 2010 San Jose mayoral election was held on June 8, 2010 to elect the Mayor of San Jose, California. It saw the reelection of Chuck Reed.

Because Reed won an outright majority in the initial round of the election, no runoff election needed to be held.

Municipal elections in California are officially non-partisan.

Results

References

San Jose
San Jose
2010